Carl-A Fechner is a German journalist, film-maker and film producer, known for documentaries about Germany's Energiewende and sustainable energy more generally.

Life 

Fechner took a degree in media education, graduating in 1980 with a diploma.  During the First Gulf War, he served as a correspondent for ARD.   Since 1988 he has been managing partner of fechnerMEDIA GmbH (formerly focus–film GmbH). His attention since then is the production of documentaries on sustainability. As editorial director, Fechner is responsible for content and artistic design of fechnerMEDIA films and media campaigns.

After producing TV documentaries, Fechner produced and directed his first cinema documentary in 2010 called The Fourth Revolution: Energy. 

In 2016, his second cinema documentary,  was released, focusing on the energy transition in Germany.

Personal life 

Fechner lives with his wife Bettina and their two children in Baden-Württemberg, Germany.

Filmography

See also 

 List of environmental films
 List of German films of the 2010s

References

External links 

 fechnermedia.com
 Power to Change: the Energy Rebellion 
 Climate Warriors 
 
 filmportal.de

1953 births
German journalists
Living people
People from Gütersloh
English-language film directors
Mass media people from North Rhine-Westphalia
Sustainability advocates